Yanina Alicia González Jorgge (born 6 December 1979 in Asunción) is a Paraguayan who studied Marketing and Advertising, and has a diploma in executive and sport coaching. Actress, model and beauty pageant titleholder who represented her country in the Miss Universe 2004 pageant, held in Quito, Ecuador on 1 June 2004; and also in the Miss Earth 2004 pageant, held in Quezon City, Philippines, on 24 October. In both pageants she was 3rd runner-up.

References

1979 births
Living people
Miss Earth 2004 contestants
Miss Universe 2004 contestants
Paraguayan beauty pageant winners
Paraguayan female models
People from Asunción